A turbine–electric transmission system includes a turboshaft gas turbine connected to an electrical generator, creating electricity that powers electric traction motors. No clutch is required.

Turbine–electric transmissions are used to drive both gas turbine locomotives (rarely) and warships.

A handful of experimental locomotives from the 1930s and 1940s used gas turbines as prime movers. These turbines were based on stationary practice, with single large reverse-flow combustors, heat exchangers and using low-cost heavy oil bunker fuel. In the 1960s the idea re-emerged, using developments in light weight engines developed for helicopters and using lighter kerosene fuels. As these turbines were compact and lightweight, the vehicles were produced as railcars rather than separate locomotives.

Naval applications
Gas and steam turbines are most efficient at thousands of revolutions per minute. This is a major drawback because of the need for heavy gears, which drive the engine into one single duty, propulsion. Electric motors provide numerous applications including use of accessories besides that of propulsion. Permanent magnets and even motor generator sets will soon be included into Naval fleets that will have a larger variety of applications.

Warships require the ability to cruise efficiently for long distances and also to have high power for intermittent bursts of speed. For that reason they use combined power systems that use an efficient prime mover, such as a diesel engine or a small gas turbine, for cruising and large gas turbines for high speed. Most of these use mechanical combination of power, through gearboxes and clutches, with systems such as CODOG (Combined Diesel or Gas) or COGAG (Combined Gas And Gas). Where electric transmissions are used, this is referred to as integrated electric propulsion or IEP.

A guided missile destroyer—for example the Zumwalt-class—allows a gas driven turbine to run generators. This generator can produce electricity to move the ship and also operate a variety of its instruments and accessories. A lot of these electricity-generating turbines are being produced to include integrated electrical propulsion. Integrated electrical propulsion is when the engine strictly runs off of electricity, without the use of any gasoline, diesel, or fuel for that matter. The electric engine is more efficient due to only being electric and not gasoline based. It allows for less pollution and provides electricity to the naval ships instruments and applications. A lot of these electricity-generating turbines are being produced to include integrated electrical propulsion. A good example of one of these systems is the COGAL (combined gas and electric) system.

An alternative approach is to use COGES, Combined Gas–Electric and Steam, to improve overall efficiency. A gas turbine-electric primary transmission is used, with a heat-recovery boiler in the exhaust flow to generate steam and thus electricity via a secondary steam turbine. Electric driven propulsion allows for movement of the ship and provides power generation on-board of the ship. Heat lost by gas turbines is not practical because it is wasting energy as heat dissipates into the surroundings. The COGES system allows the heat to be captured and converted into steam for the generation of electricity. Unlike diesel and other heavy-fuel turbines, the COGES captures the left over heat and exhaust from the turbine and it reduces pollutants from escaping into the atmosphere. The COGES system allows for practical applications in cruise ships, for example the General Electric LM2500.

Adaptable gas turbine
"The Adaptable Gas Turbine", an article by Lee S. Langston on the many uses of gas turbines, was published in the American Scientist for July–August 2013.

See also

 Diesel–electric transmission
 Gas turbine
 Gas turbine–electric locomotive
 Integrated electric propulsion
 Turbo-electric transmission
 Turbine
 Turboshaft

References

Engine technology
Gas turbine locomotives
Gas turbine technology
Marine propulsion
Electric power